Albert Guardado (born July 11, 1973) is a retired boxer from the United States, who competed for his native country at the 1996 Summer Olympics in Atlanta, Georgia. There he was defeated in the quarterfinals of the light flyweight division (– 48 kg) by Ukraine's eventual bronze medalist Oleg Kiryukhin.

Olympic results
Defeated Healer Modiradilo (Botswana) 11-9
Defeated Anicet Rasoanaivo (Madagascar) 9-4
Lost to Oleg Kiryukhin (Ukraine) 14-19

Notable results
1993 – Bronze Medal at the World Championships in Tampere, Finland
1995 – Bronze Medal at the Pan American Games in Mar del Plata, Argentina

External links
 

1973 births
Living people
Flyweight boxers
Boxers at the 1995 Pan American Games
Boxers at the 1996 Summer Olympics
Olympic boxers of the United States
Boxers from California
Winners of the United States Championship for amateur boxers
American male boxers
AIBA World Boxing Championships medalists
Pan American Games bronze medalists for the United States
Pan American Games medalists in boxing
People from Redlands, California
Medalists at the 1995 Pan American Games